Fort Cap au Gris, also called Capo Gray, was a temporary fort built in September 1814 near Troy, Missouri during the War of 1812 by Missouri Rangers under the direction of Nathan Boone, son of Daniel Boone. After the defeat of Fort Johnson, U.S. Army soldiers under the command of Zachary Taylor retreated to Cap au Gris in October 1814.

The Battle of the Sink Hole was fought near Cap au Gris in May 1815.

The unincorporated community of Cap au Gris, Missouri today occupies the site of the old fort.

References

Cap au Gris
Cap au Gris
1814 establishments in Missouri Territory